was a town located in Adachi District, Fukushima Prefecture, Japan.

On December 1, 2005, Adachi, along with the towns of Iwashiro and Tōwa (all from Adachi District), was merged into the expanded city of Nihonmatsu.

As of 2003, the town had an estimated population of 11,727 and a population density of 264.42 persons per km². The total area was 44.35 km².

External links
 Nihonmatsu official website 

Dissolved municipalities of Fukushima Prefecture
Nihonmatsu, Fukushima